Frank Lowe (June 24, 1943 – September 19, 2003) was an American avant-garde jazz saxophonist and composer.

Biography
Born and brought up in Memphis, Tennessee, Lowe took up the tenor saxophone at the age of 12. As an adult he moved to San Francisco, where he met Ornette Coleman. Coleman suggested Lowe visit to New York City, which Lowe did, and he began playing with Sun Ra and then Alice Coltrane, with whom he recorded in 1971. Unusually for the jazz culture at the time, Lowe had had no extended apprenticeship or slow paying-of-dues: one moment he was an amateur, and the next he was playing with the late John Coltrane's rhythm section. With Alice Coltrane he recorded World Galaxy in 1971.

Lowe began recording with his own group in 1973, with his album Black Beings, on ESP-Disk.

Lowe was a tenor saxophonist who was extremely influenced by the first and second waves of free jazz throughout the 1960s. His composition "Spirits in the Field" was performed on Arthur Blythe's 1977 album, The Grip.

On September 19, 2003, he died of lung cancer. His legacy was a varied body of recordings and memorable performances.

Discography

As leader
1973: Duo Exchange with Rashied Ali
1973: Black Beings with Joseph Jarman, Rashid Sinan, Raymund Cheng, William Parker
1975: Fresh with Lester Bowie Joseph Bowie, Abdul Wadud, Steve Reid
1975: The Flam with Joseph Bowie, Leo Smith, Alex Blake, Charles Bobo Shaw (Black Saint)
1976: Tricks of the Trade (Marge) with Butch Morris, Didier Levallet, George Brown
1976: The Other Side (Palm) with Butch Morris, Didier Levallet, George Brown
1977: Doctor Too-Much (Kharma) with Olu Dara, Leo Smith, Phillip Wilson, Fred Williams
1977: Lowe & Behold with Joseph Bowie, Butch Morris, Arthur Williams, Billy Bang, Polly Bradfield, Eugene Chadbourne, John Lindberg, Phillip Wilson, John Zorn, Peter Kuhn
1977: Don't Punk Out with Eugene Chadbourne
1979: Sweet Space with the Billy Bang Sextet: Billy Bang, Luther Thomas, Butch Morris, Curtis Clark, Wilber Morris, Steve McCall
1981: Skizoke with Butch Morris, Damon Choice, Larry Simon, Wilber Morris, Tim Pleasant
1981: Exotic Heartbreak with Butch Morris, Amina Claudine Myers, Wilber Morris, Tim Pleasant
1982: Live from Soundscape with Lawrence Butch Morris, Amina Claudine Myers, Wilber Morris, Tim Pleasant
1983: The Jazz Doctors: Intensive Care with Rafael Garrett, Denis Charles, Billy Bang
1984: Isle in the Ocean with  Billy Bang, Frank Wollny, Heinz Wollny, A. R. Penck
1984: Decision in Paradise with Don Cherry, Grachan Moncur III, Geri Allen, Charnett Moffett, Charles Moffett
1991: Inappropriate Choices with James Carter, Michael Marcus, Carlos Ward, Phillip Wilson
1992: Out of Nowhere with Phillip Wilson
1995: Bodies & Soul mikt Charles Moffett, Tim Flood
1996: After the Demon's Leaving with Bernard Santacruz, Denis Charles
1997: Vision Blue with Steve Neil, Anders Griffen
1998: Soul Folks with Bertha Hope, Jack Walrath, Steve Neil, Ralph Peterson
1998: One for Jazz with Billy Bang, Ed Schuller, Abbey Rader
1999: Short Tales
2000: Don't Punk Out with Eugene Chadbourne
2002: Lowe Down & Blue with Bern Nix, Dominic Duval, Michael Carvin
2014: OUT LOUD (Triple Point Records) Joe Bowie, William Parker, Steve Reid (prev. unissued live & studio recordings from 1974)

As sideman
With Alice Coltrane
World Galaxy (Impulse!, 1972)

With Billy Bang
Valve No. 10 (Soul Note, 1988)
Vietnam: The Aftermath (Justin Time, 2001)
Above & Beyond: An Evening in Grand Rapids (Justin Time, 2007)
With Don Cherry
Brown Rice (EMI, 1975)
With Joe McPhee
Legend Street One (CIMP, 1996)
Legend Street Two (CIMP, 1996)

References

1943 births
2003 deaths
Musicians from Memphis, Tennessee
American jazz saxophonists
American male saxophonists
Free jazz musicians
Freedom Records artists
DIW Records artists
ESP-Disk artists
Deaths from lung cancer
20th-century American saxophonists
Jazz musicians from Tennessee
20th-century American male musicians
American male jazz musicians